The Campeonato Paraibano Second Division is the second tier of football league of the state of Paraíba, Brazil.

List of champions

Campeonato Paraibano Misto

Segunda Divisão Profissional

Names change
Lucena EC is the currently São Paulo Crystal.
Paraiba EC is the currently Serra Branca and moved from Cajazeiras to Serra Branca.

Titles by team

Teams in bold stills active.

By city

References

  
Paraibano